Arsen Nersisyan (born 18 July 1987) is an alpine skier from Armenia. He competed for Armenia at the 2010 Winter Olympics in the slalom and giant slalom. Nersisyan was Armenia's flag bearer during the 2010 Winter Olympics opening ceremony.

References 

1987 births
Living people
Armenian male alpine skiers
Olympic alpine skiers of Armenia
Alpine skiers at the 2010 Winter Olympics